La Demajagua is a Cuban village and consejo popular ("people's council", i.e. hamlet) of the special municipality and province of Isla de la Juventud. With a population of 5,887 is the third most populated place of the island.

History
Founded in 1760 with the name of Santa Bárbara, the modern settlement was renamed La Demajagua on 11 December 1968. It was so named after the sugar mill "La Demajagua", near Manzanillo, in which Carlos Manuel de Céspedes issued his cry of independence, the "10th of October Manifesto", in 1868.

Geography
La Demajagua is located in the northwestern area of the island, nearby the road from Nueva Gerona to Siguanea Airport, and close to the lakes Presa Cristal and Presa Vietnam Heroico. It is 20 km far from Nueva Gerona, 30 from Santa Fe and 14 from its closest beach, Playa Buenavista, by the Gulf of Batabanó. The village is composed by 6 circumscriptions (76, 77, 78, 79, 80, 81).

See also

List of cities in Cuba
Municipalities of Cuba

References

External links

 La Demajagua on EcuRed

Populated places in Isla de la Juventud